Myopericytoma is a rare perivascular soft tissue tumour.  It is usually benign and typically in the distal extremities.

It is thought to overlap with myofibroma.

See also
 Glomus tumour

References

External links 

Dermal and subcutaneous growths
Vascular neoplasia